P. Mohan is an Indian politician and former member of the Tamil Nadu Legislative Assembly from the Sankarapuram constituency. He is Ex.Minister for Rural Industries (Rural Industries including Cottage Industries and Small Industries) of the Govt. of Tamil Nadu. He represents the Anna Dravida Munnetra Kazhagam party.

He is also cousin brother of DMK MLA T.Udhayasuriyan.

References 

Members of the Tamil Nadu Legislative Assembly
All India Anna Dravida Munnetra Kazhagam politicians
Living people
Year of birth missing (living people)